Kinski Gallo is a Mexican born musician and artist from Los Angeles, CA. From 2006 through 2011, Gallo was the frontman of the bi-lingual rock group, Monte Negro. In 2014, Gallo launched a solo global electronica project under his own name, Kinski Gallo. His first single, Cumbia del Corazon, was released in September 2014 as part of EA's FIFA 15 Soundtrack.

Early life

Kinski Gallo Rodriquez was born in Guadalajara, Mexico, one of nine children. His father was a mariachi singer.  Through his family and culture, Gallo was exposed to traditional romantic ballads, cumbias, boleros, and norteñtas. Gallo moved to Venice, California, in his early teens.

Career

Gallo led the rock band Monte Negro, which was formed when he was in high school. He was the lead singer; his brother Rodax was also part of the band.   In 2006 he was a vocalist in the band Madrepore, which released an album, Overblown.  Once again the band included his brother Rodax.

In 2007, Monte Negro released their debut album, "Cicatrix." It was later re-released in 2008.

In 2009 Monte Negro released an EP, Fugitives of Pleasure and Pasajeros."

In 2010, Monte Negro released their second double-album, "Cosmic Twins."

In early 2012, Monte Negro announced their disbandment. Later Gallo began a solo project, developing a new sound called Paisatronica, a spin-off of tropicália electronica. Gallo then joined Juan Covarrubias of Daddy Yankee and Robi Draco, and formerly of Phantom Vox Studios in Hollywood, CA to create an EDM DJ Project called M.O.M. (Music of Mars).

In 2013 he began performing and recording with his brother Rodax. The pair called their group Gallo.

In 2014 Gallo's artwork was on display at the ROAM Gallery in Topanga.

Currently, Gallo is working on a new EP under a new music project called "NVBES", which will be released in September.

 Discography 
EPs
 Venado (2015)
 Replicas (2020)
 M.A.N.O'' (2022)

Singles 
 "Cumbia del Corazon" (from FIFA 15 Soundtrack) (2014)

References 

Year of birth missing (living people)
Living people